The 2000–01 Eastern Counties Football League season was the 59th in the history of Eastern Counties Football League a football competition in England.

Premier Division

The Premier Division featured 20 clubs which competed in the division last season, along with two new clubs, promoted from Division One:
Ely City
Tiptree United

Also, Felixstowe Port & Town merged with Walton United to form new club Felixstowe & Walton United.

League table

Division One

Division One featured 16 clubs which competed in the division last season, along with one new club:
Wisbech Town reserves

League table

References

External links
 Eastern Counties Football League

2000-01
2000–01 in English football leagues